Zudilovo is a selo in Pervomaysky District of Altai Krai, Russia.

It is an administrative center of Municipal division Zudilovski Selsoviet.

Among local people the selo is divided into Old-Zudilovo and New-Zudilovo, with the border being the railway.

Geography 

The selo is located in 33 km from the city of Barnaul.

The climate is continental with cold winters and warm summers.

In the natural landscapes valleys and forests, both mixed coniferous and softwood prevail. The main species of trees: Pinus sylvestris, Betula, Populus tremula and other broad-leaved trees. Shrubs: Sorbus and Padus. 

The Big Cheremshanka River flows over the territory of the selo.

Transportation 

The closest cities: Novoaltaysk — 7 km, Barnaul — 33 km, Biysk — 159 km, Novosibirsk — 205 km.

Two railways traverse the selo, connecting West and East of Russia, and also R256 highway runs through the locality.

The selo is directly reachable from Novoaltaysk by bus and from Barnaul by bus and EMU.

Economy 

Apart from the «Sosnoviy Bor» sanatorium, the "Orlenok" summer camp, a skiing center, and several grocery stores, there are no enterprises, therefore residents mainly work in the cities around.

Gallery

References

Notes

External links 
 Official web-site of the «Sosnoviy Bor» Sanatorium

Rural localities in Pervomaysky District, Altai Krai